Afronta is a genus of acoels belonging to the family Haploposthiidae.

Species:

Afronta aurantiaca 
Afronta rubra

References

Acoelomorphs